HIT: The First Case is a 2020 Indian Telugu-language crime thriller film directed by debutant Sailesh Kolanu and produced by Prashanti Tipirneni. It stars Vishwak Sen and Ruhani Sharma. The plot follows Vikram Rudraraju, a police officer of the Telangana state's Homicide Intervention Team (HIT) who is tasked with investigating the missing case of an eighteen year old girl.

The First Case was released theatrically on 28 February 2020 and emerged as  profitable venture at the box office.  

The film followed by a standalone sequel titled HIT: The Second Case. Sailesh Kolanu also helmed the Hindi remake of The First Case as same title, which was released in July 2022.The story is followed up in HIT: The Second Case also directed by Sailesh with both the films forming a part of the planned in the HIT Universe.

Plot 
Vikram Rudraraju is a police officer in the Telangana CID, where he works in the Homicide Intervention Team HIT, and is a sharp person, who solves crucial cases with his ability to capture even the smallest of details, thus earning the trust of his senior Viswanath. He is in love with Neha, his colleague, and a forensic officer. Rohit is Vikram's close friend and colleague, who accompanies him in most of his cases. Vikram is constantly in an argument with Abhilash, another officer, who crosses lines with Vikram. Vikram occasionally suffers from PTSD due to his past experience and refuses to take pills as he believes it slows down his abilities.

Meanwhile, a girl named Preethi is driving on the highway, and her car stops to the side because it suffers a malfunction. Officer Ibrahim stops to help her, and she calls her father because she forgot her phone at her home. When her father comes to pick her up, he sees that she has gone missing and Ibrahim says that she got into a blue car and he thought it was his car. When Preethi's parents approach Ibrahim demandingly, he remains firm and insults them. Being a good friend of Preethi's parents, Viswanath decides to suspend Ibrahim because of how he acted and since he does not believe him. Vikram decides to take a six-month break to relieve his PTSD attacks. After two months, Vikram gets a call that Neha goes missing. He decides to go back to Viswanath and ask for the case file for Neha going missing, but he says Abhilash is dealing with the case, and he cannot give it to him. 

Vikram decides to ask Shinde, who is Neha's colleague, about the cases Neha has dealt with over the past two months. Vikram and Rohit connect Preethi's and Neha's missing cases and deduce that the same person is involved in both cases. Vikram decides to investigate, and he asks Srinivas for Preethi's case, and he takes over the case. Meanwhile, Abhilash has suspicions that Vikram was the one who kidnapped Neha. Vikram decides to go to Preethi's college, and he asks Ajay and Sandhya about what happened the previous night, and they say the same response about how they were at a pub. Vikram and Rohit ask both Preethi's parents, and they say that her parents died in a car crash and she was living with them and Preethi's neighbor Sheela about her. 

Vikram and Rohit start deducing the case, and they conclude that Sheela kidnapped Preethi after they see Sheela's blue car and a note forged by Sheela indicating the whereabouts of Preethi’s corpse. Ibrahim then sees the car and says that Sheela was not the one who kidnapped Preethi. Vikram and his team dig up the body behind the house and find that it is unnoticeable and it has a few DNA samples on it. Vikram suspects Ajay because he said that Preethi was his girlfriend. While searching for the shreds of evidence Vikram gets a call from a stranger named Latha who is stalked by a man in a car telling her to stop so that he can talk, but she drives fast and reaches the outskirts and contacts Vikram. Vikram begins his investigation in the toll booth on the highway. 

Vikram using the toll gate security cameras deduces that the man who kidnapped was Fahad, the mechanic to which Ibrahim gave his scooter to for repair. After Vikram, Abhilash, and Ibrahim find Fahad, Ibrahim is shot dead by Fahad while Vikram and Abhilash capture him. Fahad takes them to the house where he received the money to kidnap Preethi. Vikram finds out that it was Rohit's house, and before Rohit shoots him, he shoots him dead. Abhilash goes upstairs and gets Neha. It is found that Swapna, Rohit's wife, killed Preethi and kidnapped Neha. During Rohit's funeral Swapna explains how Preethi, herself, and her younger sister belonged to the same orphanage. Swapna's younger sister was suffering from a deadly heart disease. She wants her sister to be adopted as she can undergo treatment and can be saved. Swapna requested Preethi to decline the adoption, but ultimately Preethi was adopted. 

When Mohan's brother and his wife adopted Preethi, Swapna becomes furious as her sister had died due to lack of treatment. She kidnaps and kills Preethi with the help of Fahad to avenge her sister's death. Rohit tries to protect Swapna by burying her behind the guest house and planting the DNA evidence. Swapna explains the whole story and she gets arrested. Vikram attends the funeral of both Preethi and Ibrahim. The unidentified DNA on Preethi was of Rohit. He knew he would be caught and wanted to die at the hands of Vikram. When Neha and Vikram are talking, Vikram almost gets shot. It is then hinted that the story would continue in HIT: The Second Case.

Cast 

Vishwak Sen as Vikram Rudraraju 
Ruhani Sharma as Neha
Chaitanya Sagiraju as Rohit
Brahmaji as R. Shinde
Hari Teja as Sheela
Murli Sharma as Ibrahim Shaikh
Bhanu Chander as Vishwanath. K
 Kalpika Ganesh as Dr. Roopa
 Naveena Reddy as Swapna
Dhanvi as Young Swapna
 Ravi Raja as Fahad
 Sahiti Avancha as Preethi
Vanshi kakkar as Young Preethi
 Ravi Varma as Srinivas
 Maganti Srinath as Abhilash
 Rangadham as Mohan
 Roopa Lakshmi as Lakshmi
 Rajeshwari as Latha
 Kalpalatha as Saraswati
 Trish as Ajay
 Jaiyetri as Sandya 
Satya Krishnan as Priya
Sri Harsha as Shiva

Production 
On 24 October 2019, the film's ceremonial pooja was held and production for the film commenced. Nani and Prashanti Tipirneni produced the film under "Wall Poster Cinema" banner. This film is their second venture after Awe. A teaser was launched on 1 January 2020. The film's title is an acronym for "Homicide Intervention Team".

Soundtrack 

The songs were composed by Vivek Sagar. The singles "Poraatame" and "Ventaade Gaayam" were released on February 25 and February 26, respectively.

Home media 
The movie was released on Amazon Prime Video on 1 April 2020, while the satellite rights were purchased by Gemini TV.

Critical reception 
The Hindu gave the film a positive review praising the screenplay and the performances of the cast. The Deccan Chronicle gave the film three out of five stars and wrote that "Vishwak Sen’s brilliant performance and Vivek Sagar’s background music mark this film". Hemanth Kumar of Firstpost rated the film 3.25 stars out of 5, saying,"If you love crime dramas, HIT is a thrilling experience, which falters a bit in the end." Janani K of India Today said, "Director Sailesh Kolanu's HIT is a brilliant investigation thriller that will blow your mind right from the beginning." Neeshita Nyayapati of The Times of India said, "HIT is definitely not a film that will keep you on the edge of the seat, but it keeps you engaged enough to know more." Baradwaj Rangan of Film Companion South wrote "In this whodunit, directed by Sailesh Kolanu, the sophistication in filmmaking is matched by a sophisticated worldview. But it needed a better closing stretch."

Remake 
Kolanu also directed the film's Hindi remake with the same name starring Rajkummar Rao and Sanya Malhotra. It released on 15 July 2022.

Sequel 

In March 2021, the sequel was announced by Nani. Actor Adivi Sesh plays the lead Krishna Dev who is a police officer of the Andhra Pradesh HIT team. The sequel would not focus on what happened after The First Case, and starts as an original story, but has references and connections to the first part(as it is the part of universe). The film was originally scheduled for a theatrical release on 29 July 2022, but was delayed and instead released on 2 December 2022. A third HIT (The Third Case) movie is also in development.

References

External links 

2020 directorial debut films
2020 films
Indian action thriller films
Indian thriller drama films
Indian mystery thriller films
2020s Telugu-language films
2020 action thriller films
2020 thriller drama films
2020s mystery thriller films
Fictional portrayals of the Telangana Police
Films about missing people
Films set in Hyderabad, India
Films shot in Hyderabad, India
Films directed by Sailesh Kolanu